Niaz, NIAZ, Niyas or Neyaz may refer to:

People
Niaz Ahmed (cricketer) (1945–2000), Pakistani cricketer
Niaz Mohammad Khan (1907–1972), Chief Commissioner of the Pakistan Boy Scouts Association
Niaz Murshed (born 1966), Bangladeshi chess player
Niaz Morshed (Dhaka cricketer) (born 1983), Bangladeshi cricketer
Niaz Morshed (Khulna cricketer) (fl. 1999–2005), Bangladeshi cricketer in the Khulna Division

Places
Arbab Niaz Stadium, a Test cricket ground in Peshawar, North West Frontier Province, Pakistan
Niaz Stadium, a cricket ground in Hyderabad, Pakistan
Niaz, Ardabil, a village in Ardabil Province, Iran
Niaz Sui, a village in Ardabil Province, Iran
Niaz, East Azerbaijan, a village in East Azerbaijan Province, Iran
Niaz, Kurdistan, a village in Kurdistan Province, Iran
Niazabad, Lorestan, a village in Lorestan Province, Iran
Niaz, West Azerbaijan, a village in West Azerbaijan Province, Iran
Qalʽeh-ye Niaz, a village in Badghis Province in north western Afghanistan

Organisations
 , a Dutch healthcare accreditation organisation